Choszczowe  is a village in the administrative district of Gmina Zabrodzie, within Wyszków County, Masovian Voivodeship, in east-central Poland.

The village has a population of 190.

References

Choszczowe